The 1991 Island Games in Åland was the 2nd edition in which a men's football (soccer) tournament was played at the multi-games competition. It was contested by 8 teams.

The Faroe Islands won the tournament for the second time.

Participants

Group phase

Group 1

Group 2

Placement play-off matches

7th place match

5th place match

3rd Place Match

Final

Final rankings

Top goalscorers

6 goals
  Jens Erik Rasmussen

5 goals
  Adam Greig

4 goals
 Chris Hamon

3 goals
 Karl Kreutzmann

External links
Official 1991 website

1991
1990–91 in European football
1991
1991 in Finnish football
1991 in Faroe Islands football